This is a list of members of the Victorian Legislative Assembly as elected at the 26 June 1924 state election and subsequent by-elections up to the general elections of 9 April 1927:

 On 11 July 1924, the Labor member for Glenelg, William Thomas, died. Labor candidate Ernie Bond won the resulting by-election on 14 August 1924.
 On 23 December 1924, the Labor member for Fitzroy, John Billson, died. Labor candidate Maurice Blackburn won the resulting by-election on 4 February 1925.
 On 10 November 1925, the Labor member for Flemington, Edward Warde, died. Labor candidate Jack Holland won the resulting by-election on 9 December 1925.

 = district abolished in 1927

References

 Re-member (a database of all Victorian MPs since 1851). Parliament of Victoria.

Members of the Parliament of Victoria by term
20th-century Australian politicians